The Cheshire Bridge spans the Connecticut River between Charlestown, New Hampshire and Springfield, Vermont.

History
The first bridge at this location was completed in 1806 by the Cheshire Bridge Co. and was described as a Town lattice covered toll bridge, a wooden covered bridge. In 1897 the bridge was purchased by the Springfield Electric Railway.

In 1906 the old bridge was replaced by the Iron Bridge Co., at a cost of US$65,000 (US$ with inflation). It was a three-span steel Pratt truss bridge, which had a  span and a -wide roadway. Vehicles ran both ways, and also freight and passenger cars. In 1930 the bridge was replaced by the McClintic-Marshall Co. of Pittsburgh, PA at a cost of US$225,000 (US$ with inflation). It is a three-span Pennsylvania truss that is  feet long.

The bridge was purchased by the state of New Hampshire in 1992. Tolls were collected until 2001.

References

External links 
http://www.worthpoint.com/worthopedia/1892-photo-log-jam-at-cheshire-bridge-charlestown

Bridges in Sullivan County, New Hampshire
Railroad bridges in Vermont
Railroad bridges in New Hampshire
Charlestown, New Hampshire
Buildings and structures in Springfield, Vermont
Bridges over the Connecticut River
Bridges in Windsor County, Vermont
Former toll bridges in New Hampshire
Former toll bridges in Vermont
Steel bridges in the United States
Pennsylvania truss bridges in the United States
Road bridges in Vermont
Road bridges in New Hampshire
Interstate vehicle bridges in the United States
1930 establishments in New Hampshire
1930 establishments in Vermont